Jonathan Stuart "Jon" Fitch (June 8, 1950 – February 26, 2011) was an American politician from Arkansas.

Biography
Fitch born in Fayetteville, Arkansas. He graduated from the University of Arkansas in 1973. He lived in Hindsville, Arkansas and a farmer. Fitch was a Democrat member of the Arkansas House of Representatives and member of the Arkansas State Senate; All together, Fitch served 22 years in the Arkansas General Assembly, 18 of which were in the Senate. In 2007, Fitch was appointed by then-Governor Mike Beebe to serve as the Director of the Arkansas Livestock and Poultry commission, a position which he held until his passing in February 2011. Fitch was inducted into the Arkansas Agricultural Hall of Fame as part of Class XXV. He died at the University of Arkansas Medical Science in Little Rock, Arkansas.

Notes

External links

Politicians from Fayetteville, Arkansas
People from Madison County, Arkansas
Farmers from Arkansas
University of Arkansas alumni
Members of the Arkansas House of Representatives
Arkansas state senators
1950 births
2011 deaths